The 2015 Alcorn State Braves football team represented Alcorn State University in the 2015 NCAA Division I FCS football season. The Braves were led by fourth-year head coach Jay Hopson and played their home games at Casem-Spinks Stadium. They were a member of the East Division of the Southwestern Athletic Conference (SWAC) and finished with a record of 9–4 as SWAC champions after they defeated Grambling State in the SWAC Championship Game.  Alcorn State then played in the Celebration Bowl against North Carolina A&T, losing by a score of 41–34.

On January 30, 2016, head coach Jay Hopson resigned to become the head coach at Southern Miss. He finished at Alcorn State with a record of 32–17 and two SWAC championships.

Schedule

Source: Schedule
 * Games will air on a tape delayed basis

Ranking movements

References

Alcorn State
Alcorn State Braves football seasons
Southwestern Athletic Conference football champion seasons
Alcorn State Braves football